Jacques Gamelin (October 3, 1738 – October 12, 1803) was an artist born in Carcassonne, France, the son of a successful merchant. After receiving an education from the Jesuits, he went into the service of Nicolas Joseph de Marcassus, baron de Puymaurin (1718–1791), a wealthy industrialist of Toulouse, in order to learn the ways of business. Puymaurin quickly saw that his young assistant had little talent or interest in business but showed great promise as an artist. Gamelin's father rejected Puymaurin's suggestion that Jacques be sent to an art academy, so the baron paid his way at the Académie royale de Toulouse himself. After five years study, Jacques Gamelin won the Académie's first prize and he went to Paris to continue his studies. Gamelin later went to Rome with Puymaurin's financial assistance to study under Jacques-Louis David and Joseph-Marie Vien and eventually became a painter to Pope Clement XIV. On the death of his father, which left Jacques a wealthy man, he returned to Toulouse where he taught at the Académie. He is most known today for his paintings and engravings of battle scenes, which can be found in art museums throughout France. Jacques Gamelin died in Carcassonne on October 12, 1803.

When Jacques Gamelin returned to France after his father's death, he undertook his great work, Nouveau recueil d'ostéologie et de myologie, most likely funding its publication using some of his great inheritance. The work is known for its display of both talent and imagination, with striking scenes of the Resurrection, the Crucifixion, and skeletons at play. Aside from the full-page copperplate illustrations by Gamelin and the engraver Lavalée, the work contains a number of intriguing vignettes on the title pages and elsewhere, which show battle scenes, visitations by death on unsuspecting revelers, and the anatomical artist's studio.

References
 Dictionnaire de biographie française. (Paris: Librairie Letouzey et ané, 1933-). Vol. XV, col. 309–310.
 Morton's Medical Bibliography (Garrison and Morton). Ed. by Jeremy Norman. 5th ed. (Aldershot, Hants.: Scolar Press; Brookfield, Vt., USA : Gower Pub. Co., 1991). No. 401.1.

External links
 Jacques Gamelin: Nouveau receuil d'ostéologie et de myologie dessiné après nature … pour l'utilité des sciences et des arts. (Toulouse, 1779). Selected pages scanned from the original work. Historical Anatomies on the Web. US National Library of Medicine.

1738 births
1803 deaths
People from Carcassonne
18th-century French painters
Court painters
Pupils of Jacques-Louis David